The 2015 Open Castilla y León was a professional tennis tournament played on hard courts. It was the 30th edition of the tournament which was part of the 2015 ATP Challenger Tour. It took place in Segovia, Spain between 3 and 9 August 2015.

Singles main-draw entrants

Seeds

 1 Rankings are as of July 28, 2015.

Other entrants
The following players received wildcards into the singles main draw:
  Francisco Blanco Paris
  Chung Yun-seong
  Marcel Granollers
  Jorge Ruano

The following player entered using a protected ranking:
  Marco Chiudinelli

The following players received entry from the qualifying draw:
  Sébastien Boltz
  Egor Gerasimov
  Nikola Mektić
  Georgi Rumenov

The following players received entry by a lucky loser spot:
  Riccardo Ghedin
  Roberto Ortega-Olmedo

Champions

Singles

  Evgeny Donskoy def.  Marco Chiudinelli 7–6(7–2), 6–3

Doubles

  Alexander Kudryavtsev /  Denys Molchanov def.  Aliaksandr Bury /  Andreas Siljeström 6–2, 6–4

External links
 Official website
 ITF Search
 ATP official site

Castilla
Castilla y Leon
Open Castilla y Leon
Open Castilla y León
2015 Open Castilla y León